Antonio Peña Díaz (born in 1936) is a Mexican biochemist who received the Carlos J. Finlay Prize for Microbiology (UNESCO, 2003) and chaired both the Mexican Academy of Sciences (1992–93) and the Mexican Society of Biochemistry (1981–83).

Peña Díaz holds a bachelor's degree in Medicine and both a master's and a doctorate degree from the National Autonomous University of Mexico (UNAM). He is currently an emeritus professor of the Institute for Cellular Physiology of the same university and has worked as a visiting scholar at the University of Rochester.

Selected works
 ("Biochemistry", 1979)
 ("The Membranes of the Cell", 1986)
 ("Energy and Life: Bioenergetics", with Georges Dreyfus Cortés, 1990)
 ("How Does a Cell Work: Cellular Physiology", 1995)
 ("What is Metabolism?", 2001)

Notes and references

Mexican biochemists
Members of the Mexican Academy of Sciences
National Autonomous University of Mexico alumni
Academic staff of the National Autonomous University of Mexico
University of Rochester faculty
People from Durango
1936 births
Living people
21st-century Mexican scientists
20th-century Mexican scientists